Petra del Carmen Cabrera Díaz (born 19 May 1990) is a Venezuelan professional footballer who plays as a centre back for Brazilian Série A1 club Real Brasília FC and the Venezuela women's national team.

International career
Cabrera played for Venezuela at senior level in two Copa América Femenina editions (2014 and 2018) and the 2018 Central American and Caribbean Games.

References

1990 births
Living people
People from Lara (state)
Venezuelan women's footballers
Women's association football central defenders
Trujillanos FC players
La Equidad footballers
Campeonato Brasileiro de Futebol Feminino Série A1 players
Venezuela women's international footballers
Venezuelan expatriate women's footballers
Venezuelan expatriate sportspeople in Colombia
Expatriate women's footballers in Colombia
Venezuelan expatriate sportspeople in Brazil
Expatriate women's footballers in Brazil